"Age of Reason" is a song by Australian pop rock singer John Farnham. Written by Todd Hunter and Johanna Pigott, it was released as the first single from Farnham's 1988 album of the same name. The song topped Australia's ARIA Singles Chart for four weeks and became a top-five hit in New Zealand, where it peaked at number four. At the APRA Music Awards of 1990, the song won the Most Performed Australasian Popular Work award.

Composition
"Age of Reason" was composed by Todd Hunter and partner Johanna Pigott, who had previously written the song "Rain" for Dragon and played together in the XL Capris. Pigott said, "You write songs and you're surprised at what you wrote sometimes, and you think, goodness, is that me, did I do that? It's not something you consider of perfect taste or anything, and someone records them and you think that's fantastic. It's a really exciting and thrilling thing."

Music video
The music video for "Age of Reason" was filmed in 1988 and included six key scenes, with the Victorian Children's Choir in three of the sequences: running through a scrap metal yard, running down a hill behind Farnham, and standing in a warehouse as Farnham walks between them.

In the "making of" feature included on the One Voice: The Greatest Clips DVD, Farnham can be seen singing with the children after the film clip wraps shooting in the warehouse. They each received a copy of the track on vinyl.

Track listing
 "Age of Reason" (wxtended mix) – 7:42	
 "Age of Reason" (album) – 5:08	
 "When the War Is Over" – 4:49

Personnel
 John Farnham – vocals
 David Hirschfelder – keyboards, piano
 Brett Garsed – guitars
 Angus Burchall – drums and percussion
 Wayne Nelson – bass
 Venetta Fields – vocals
 Lindsay Field – vocals
 Thomas Metropouli – mandolin and piano accordion
 Lisa Edwards – additional vocals
 Ross Hannaford – additional vocals
 Joe Creighton – additional vocals

Charts

Weekly charts

Year-end charts

See also
 List of number-one singles in Australia during the 1980s

References

John Farnham songs
1988 singles
1988 songs
APRA Award winners
Number-one singles in Australia
RCA Records singles
Songs written by Johanna Pigott
Songs written by Todd Hunter